City Press is a South African news brand that publishes on multiple platforms. Its flagship print edition is distributed nationally on Sunday, and it has a daily newsletter, online platform, and other social media platforms. These include Twitter, Facebook, Instagram and YouTube.

The publication also runs a popular, daily morning newsletter called On a Point of Order, a play on the South African Parliament scene, which frequently sees members of Parliament rising "on a point of order" to protest against something that somebody has said.

Its other newsletters include:

 Football Fever, a thrice weekly curation of news and analysis on the beautiful game;
 Sundays With City Press, which features all the highlights of the print edition; and
 #Trending – The Good Guide, a guide to all the latest culture, entertainment and tech news.

History and operations

The newspaper was established in 1982 as the Golden City Press by James R. A. Bailey and the South African Associated Newspapers (SAAN) group. The following year, "Golden" was dropped from the newspaper's name. SAAN later withdrew from its partnership with Bailey and the newspaper ran into financial difficulties.

Nasionale Pers took over the publication of the newspaper as well as its sister publications, Drum and True Love & Family, on 1 April 1984.

The newspaper is currently owned by South Africa's leading company, Media24, which is the media arm of Naspers.

The editor in chief of the City Press news brand is Mondli Makhanya. He has been at the helm of the news brand since 1 August 2016. Prior to Makhanya, the news brand was edited by Ferial Haffajee, who joined City Press on 1 July 2009.

It counts among its ranks of former editors Khathu Mamaila, Mathatha Tsedu and Len Kalane, who wrote a book about his experiences as editor of City Press, entitled The Chapter We Wrote: The City Press Story.

Distribution areas
The newspaper is distributed nationally and in neighbouring countries, including Botswana, Lesotho, Namibia and Swaziland. It has a readership of about 2.5 million (source: AMPS 2001A).

Distribution figures

Readership figures

See also 
 List of newspapers in South Africa

References

External links
 City Press website
 SAARF website

1982 establishments in South Africa
English-language newspapers published in Africa
Mass media in Johannesburg
Weekly newspapers published in South Africa
Newspapers established in 1972